The 1990 SEC women's basketball tournament took place March 1 to March 4, 1990, in Albany, Georgia.

Auburn won the tournament by beating Tennessee in the championship game.

Tournament

Asterisk denotes game ended in overtime.

All-Tournament team

References

Sec Women's Basketball Tournament, 1990
SEC women's basketball tournament
1990 in sports in Georgia (U.S. state)